Macrocoma seriesericans is a species of leaf beetle of Algeria, described by Léon Fairmaire in 1876.

References

seriesericans
Beetles of North Africa
Beetles described in 1876
Taxa named by Léon Fairmaire
Endemic fauna of Algeria